Karşıyaka Basket, mostly known as Pınar Karşıyaka for sponsorship reasons, is a Turkish professional basketball team located in Karşıyaka, İzmir, that competes in the Turkish Basketball Super League. It is a section of the multi-sport club Karşıyaka SK. The team also goes by the name of KSK, which stands for Karşıyaka Spor Kulübü (i.e. Karşıyaka Sport Club).

History

Karşıyaka SK was founded in 1912 and opened its basketball section in 1966. Karşıyaka Basket is considered to be one of the most important basketball teams in all of Turkey. They first played in the Turkish Basketball League in 1966. They relegated to lower divisions in 1968. The club also played in lower divisions from 1968 to 1974. The team is still participating in the Turkish Basketball League since 1974. Karşıyaka Basket is sponsored by Pınar since 1998. It is the product of Yaşar Holding's Food and Beverage Group. Their home arena is the Karşıyaka Arena with a capacity of 6,500 seats, which was opened in 2005.

Big achievements with Sarıca

Karşıyaka set to name Ufuk Sarıca as head coach in the summer of 2012. Sarıca was dreamed to be in Euroleague with Karşıyaka and he said that "We have a dream and we want to be in Euroleague in 3 years." On February 9, 2014, the team won the Turkish Cup with a victory against Anadolu Efes under managing Ufuk Sarıca. It was the first championship of club in Turkish Cup. On October 8, 2014, the team won the President's Cup by beating Fenerbahçe Ülker. In the 2014–15, Karşıyaka won its second Turkish League after 1987 championship, despite finishing the regular season in the fourth place, by defeating Fenerbahçe Ülker in the playoffs semifinals by 3–1 and Anadolu Efes 4–1 in the finals.

On 29 July 2015, EuroLeague announced the participating teams for the following season and included Karşıyaka with for the 2015–16 EuroLeague season. In its second appearance ever in the top tier of European basketball, the team won 3 games and lost 7.

Honours

National competitions
Turkish Super League
 Winners (2): 1986–87, 2014–15
 Runner-up (1): 1983–84
Turkish Cup
 Winner (1): 2013–14
 Runner-up (1): 2004–05
President's Cup
 Winners (2): 1987, 2014

European competitions
Basketball Champions League

 Runner-up (1): 2020–21

FIBA EuroChallenge
 Runner-up (1): 2012–13

Home arenas
İzmir Atatürk Sport Hall: (1966–2005)
Karşıyaka Arena: (2005–present)

Players

Current roster

Depth chart

Notable players

 Efe Aydan
 Hüseyin Beşok
 Kaya Peker
 Arda Vekiloğlu
 Mehmet Yağmur
 Şemsettin Baş
 Ufuk Sarıca
 Hakan Köseoğlu
 Muratcan Güler
- Asım Pars
 Serhat Çetin
 Ümit Sonkol
 Barış Ermiş
 Furkan Aldemir
 Birkan Batuk
 İlkan Karaman
 Erkan Veyseloğlu
 Barış Hersek
 Kerem Gönlüm
 İnanç Koç
- Kenan Sipahi
 Berk Uğurlu
 Metin Türen
- Metecan Birsen
 Semih Erden
 Berkan Durmaz
 Burak Can Yıldızlı
 Juan Palacios
 Assem Marei
 Amath M'Baye
 Alex Tyus
 Roberts Štelmahers
 Vrbica Stefanov
 Thomas Abercrombie
 Alade Aminu
 Jaime Lloreda
 Mateusz Ponitka
 Zakhar Pashutin
 Jovo Stanojević
 Michael Roll
 Jim Rowinski
 Dallas Comegys
- Henry Domercant
 Marcus Slaughter
 Gary Neal
- Quinton Hosley
- Will Thomas
- D. J. Strawberry
- Ali Muhammed
 DaJuan Summers
- Jordan Morgan
 Bonzie Colson
 Esteban Batista

Award winners

Head coaches

 Aydan Siyavuş (1973–1975)
 Nadir Vekiloğlu
 Aydan Siyavuş (1990–1991)
 Murat Didin (1998–1999)
 Ergin Ataman (1999)
 Ahmet Kandemir (2003–2006)
 Levent Topsakal (2006)
 Okan Çevik (2006–2007)
 Ahmet Kandemir (2007–2008)
 Ayhan Kalyoncu (2008–2009)
 Hakan Demir (2009–2012)
 Ufuk Sarıca (2012–2016)
 Nenad Marković (2016–2017)
 Aleksandar Trifunović (2017–2018)
 Özhan Çıvgın (2018–2019)
 Dirk Bauermann (2019)
 Ufuk Sarıca (2019–present)

Season by season

 Cancelled due to the COVID-19 pandemic in Europe.

See also
 Karşıyaka S.K.
 Karşıyaka Women's Volleyball Team

References

External links
 Official website 
 Official website 
 TBLStat.net Profile
 Eurobasket Profile

Karşıyaka S.K.
Basketball teams in Turkey
Basketball teams established in 1912
Turkish Basketball Super League teams
1912 establishments in the Ottoman Empire
Sports teams in İzmir